This is a list of Springfield city departments. The departments are part of the larger municipal government of the capital of the U.S. state of Illinois, Springfield.

Boards and commissions
Disability Commission
Historic Sites Commission
Municipal Band Commission
Veterans Advisory Council
Springfield Metropolitan Exposition and Auditorium Authority

Divisions
Building Division - Department of Public Works
City Engineer
International Visitors Commission
Oak Ridge Cemetery
Traffic Engineering Department
Vital Records
Zoning Division - Department of Public Works

Executive offices
City Clerk
City Treasurer
Communications Director
Council Coordinator
Executive Assistant
Mayor

General departments
Department of Community Relations
Department of Public Works
Fire Department
Office of Budget & Management
Office of Business Licensing
Office of Corporation Counsel
Office of Education Liaison
Office of Human Resources
Office of Planning & Economic Development
Police Department

Other entities
City Water, Light & Power
Lincoln Library
Springfield, Illinois Convention & Visitors Bureau

References
City of Springfield, Official Site. Retrieved 8 March 2007.

City departments in Springfield, Illinois
Springfield